is the first album by the Japanese girl group Momoiro Clover Z. It was released in Japan on July 27, 2011.

Release details 
The album was released in three versions: Regular Edition and Limited Editions A and B. The regular edition was CD-only, the limited edition A included a second CD with six solo songs, and the limited edition B included a DVD with two music videos. The album is also available on two LPs.

Reception 
The album debuted at weekly number 3 in the Oricon chart.

The album won Grand Prix at the 4th CD Shop Awards, making Momoiro Clover Z the first idols to win it. The CD Shop Awards ceremony is held annually; the winners are chosen by votes from Japanese record store clerks.

When the two limited editions (A and B) of Battle and Romance were re-released on April 10, 2013, the album updated its peak position to 2nd, selling approximately 38,000 copies in the re-release week.

Track listing

Charts

Awards

4th CD Shop Awards 

|-align="center"
|rowspan="2"| 2011
|rowspan="2"| Battle and Romance
| Grand Prix
|

References

External links 
 Battle and Romance - Official Momoiro Clover Z discography

Momoiro Clover Z albums
2011 debut albums
King Records (Japan) albums